The 2008 Misano Superbike World Championship round was the eighth round of the 2008 Superbike World Championship. It took place on the weekend of June 27–29, 2008, at the Misano Adriatico circuit.

Superbike race 1 classification

Superbike race 2 classification

Supersport race classification

References 
 Superbike Race 1
 Superbike Race 2
 Supersport Race

Misano Round
Misano